Jay Kristopher Huddy (sometimes credited as Jason K. Huddy) is an American artist, filmmaker, and video game designer from Western New York. He was first known for creating the video game parody Los Disneys, a first-person shooter set in a dystopian future version of Walt Disney World's Magic Kingdom based on popular urban legends and conspiracy theories. He later went on to develop television shows and another game, Blood of Bin Laden, based on news stories leading up to and following the September 11 attacks.

In his book From Sun Tzu to Xbox, former Village Voice writer Ed Halter described Huddy's work as "art that purloins mass-media culture in the pop traditions of Warhol or Rauschenberg." Huddy is based in New York City, where he has worked as a digital media designer for The Economist, Nickelodeon, CBS Interactive, and as the art director for Looking Glass magazine. 

Huddy is also the inventor of Replayar, a patented augmented reality (AR) creation and retrieval system that geocaches personal and historical images as AR experiences that can be viewed as overlays on the environments in which they were filmed.

References

External links
HuddyCreative.com
Replayar

1976 births
Living people
American filmmakers
American video game designers
People from New York (state)